The Slopes is a town near Sydney, in the state of New South Wales, Australia. It is located in the City of Hawkesbury. It is situated east of Tennyson and north of Kurmond.

Their median age was 49 years, compared to the national median of 37 years.

References

Suburbs of Sydney
City of Hawkesbury